Much Wenlock, often called simply Wenlock, was a constituency of the House of Commons of the Parliament of England until 1707, then of the Parliament of Great Britain from 1707 to 1800, and finally of the Parliament of the United Kingdom from 1801 to 1885, when it was abolished.
It was named after the town of that name in Shropshire.

The seat was founded in 1468 as a borough constituency and was represented throughout its history by two burgesses.

Boundaries
Much Wenlock's constituency boundaries ran from Leighton to just west of Dawley, to Ironbridge, and finally to just east of Madeley along the northern border; travelling eastwards, the boundaries ran from just east of Madeley to the bend in the River Severn, following the river thereafter. The far southern border, commencing in the east, travelled along the southern part of the Severn across to Easthope; the western border, running northwards, going from Easthope through to Benthall, and onwards back to Leighton.

Members of Parliament

Constituency created (1468)

Constituency abolished (1885)

Election results

Elections in the 1830s
Weld-Forester was appointed Groom of the Bedchamber to William IV, requiring a by-election.

Elections in the 1840s

Gaskell was appointed a Lord Commissioner of the Treasury, requiring a by-election.

Elections in the 1850s
Weld-Forester was appointed Comptroller of the Household, requiring a by-election.

Gaskell was appointed Comptroller of the Household, requiring a by-election.

Elections in the 1860s

Elections in the 1870s

Forester succeeded to the peerage, becoming Lord Forester and causing a by-election.

Elections in the 1880s

See also
Parliamentary constituencies in Shropshire#Historical constituencies
List of former United Kingdom Parliament constituencies
Unreformed House of Commons

References

  The History of Parliament Trust, Much Wenlock, Borough, from 1529 to 1714
  The History of Parliament Trust, Wenlock, Borough, from 1715 to 1831

Parliamentary constituencies in Shropshire (historic)
Constituencies of the Parliament of the United Kingdom established in 1468
Constituencies of the Parliament of the United Kingdom disestablished in 1885
Much Wenlock